Lodewijk Rudolf Arthur Parisius (July 23, 1911 in Hannover, Para District, Suriname – December 14, 1963) was a Surinamese/Dutch tenor saxophonist commonly known as "Kid Dynamite." He was noted for mixing jazz with Surinamese kaseko.

He also supported Coleman Hawkins's popularity in the Netherlands. He died in a road accident in Germany.

Web sources

External links
Website about the history of Dutch jazz 

1911 births
1963 deaths
Jazz tenor saxophonists
Dutch jazz saxophonists
Male saxophonists
Surinamese musicians
People from Para District
Surinamese emigrants to the Netherlands
Road incident deaths in Germany
20th-century saxophonists
20th-century Dutch male musicians
Male jazz musicians